Willeke Alberti (born 3 February 1945) (real name: Willy Albertina Verbrugge) is a Dutch singer and actress, the daughter of entertainer and singer Willy Alberti (1926–1985) and Hendrika Geertruida Kuiper (1921–2011).

Biography

Willeke Alberti started her career at the early age of eleven in the musical Duel om Barbara and she recorded her first single in 1958 together with her father. During the 1960s, she was a well-known singer in the Netherlands and had at least one No. 1 hit with "De winter was lang" ("The winter was long"), however there was no official Dutch chart at the time. Willeke and her father had a television show between 1965 and 1969. Her singing career from 1970 onwards is less active, however Alberti still releases singles and albums at an irregular interval and plays minor roles in television programs and movies.

From 1964 to 1974 she was married to musician Joop Oonk and they had a daughter. She married John de Mol in 1976, and they had a son, Johnny de Mol. The couple divorced in 1980, and Alberti married a third time, with football player Søren Lerby. Another son was born from that marriage. Søren Lerby and Willeke Alberti separated in 1996.

In 1994 she represented the Netherlands in the Eurovision Song Contest with the song "Waar is de zon?" ("Where is the sun?"), which claimed a meagre four points from the international juries, all coming from Austria, placing 23rd.

Through the years Alberti has become embraced in the Netherlands as a gay icon, due to a combination of her song repertoire, her durability and her performances in support of many gay causes.

Filmography
De Kleine Waarheid (TV Series) 1970
Oom Ferdinand en de Toverdrank (1974)
Slippers (TV Movie) (1975)
Rooie Sien (1975)
Kiss Me Kate (TV Movie) (1975)
Pygmalion (TV Movie) (1976)
Lachcarrousel (TV Movie) (1976)
Dag 80 hallo 81 (1980)
Filmpje! (1995)
Nachtrit (2006)
Alles is familie (2012)
Sinterklaas en de Pepernoten Chaos (2013)

References

External links

 

1945 births
Dutch film actresses
Dutch levenslied singers
Dutch television actresses
Eurovision Song Contest entrants for the Netherlands
Eurovision Song Contest entrants of 1994
Actresses from Amsterdam
Living people
20th-century Dutch actresses
Musicians from Amsterdam
21st-century Dutch actresses
20th-century Dutch women singers
21st-century Dutch women singers
21st-century Dutch singers
Knights of the Order of Orange-Nassau